Ziros is a village in the municipality Sitia, Lasithi regional unit, Crete, Greece. It was the seat of government for the former municipality Lefki.

The village of Ziros is 30 kilometers south of Sitia on the Sitia - Piskokefalo - Epano Episkopi - Chandras - Ziros road. There are a number of Byzantine churches in the area.

External links

Populated places in Lasithi